Ville-Valtteri Starck (born 3 February 1995) is a Finnish footballer who currently plays for FC Jazz in the Finnish second tier Ykkönen. He has previously played three seasons in the Finnish top division Veikkausliiga for TPS Turku.

References

External links 
STARCK Ville-Valtteri Veikkausliiga.

1995 births
Living people
Finnish footballers
Turun Palloseura footballers
FC Jazz players
Veikkausliiga players
Ykkönen players
Åbo IFK players
Association football defenders